Andrés Lorenzo Ríos (born 1 August 1989) known as Andy Ríos, is an Argentine professional footballer who plays as a striker for Defensa y Justicia. Following the 2021 season, San Jose declined their contract option on Ríos.

Club career
Coming through the well regarded youth system of River Plate, Ríos made his debut on 4 March 2007 in the 1–2 away loss against Estudiantes.

International career
In January 2009, Ríos was selected to join the Argentina under-20 squad for the 2009 South American Youth Championship in Venezuela.

Career statistics

Club
Correct as of 26 June 2012

Honours

Club
River Plate
 Primera División Clausura: 2008
 Nacional B: 2011–12

Wisła Kraków
Ekstraklasa: 2010–11

References

External links
 Andrés Ríos – Argentine Primera statistics at Fútbol XXI  
 Player profile at River´s website
 
 

1989 births
Living people
Footballers from Buenos Aires
Argentine footballers
Argentine expatriate footballers
Association football forwards
Club Atlético River Plate footballers
Wisła Kraków players
C.D. Cuenca footballers
Leones Negros UdeG footballers
Club América footballers
Defensa y Justicia footballers
CR Vasco da Gama players
Racing Club de Avellaneda footballers
San Jose Earthquakes players
Aldosivi footballers
Argentine Primera División players
Primera Nacional players
Ekstraklasa players
Liga MX players
Ecuadorian Serie A players
Campeonato Brasileiro Série A players
Major League Soccer players
Argentine expatriate sportspeople in Poland
Argentine expatriate sportspeople in Ecuador
Argentine expatriate sportspeople in Mexico
Argentine expatriate sportspeople in Brazil
Expatriate footballers in Poland
Expatriate footballers in Ecuador
Expatriate footballers in Mexico
Expatriate footballers in Brazil